John Hahn (born February 6, 1989) is an American professional golfer who previously competed on the European Tour. He now works for Goldman Sachs in West Palm Beach, Florida.

Amateur career
Hahn played college golf at Kent State University where he was a three-time All-American and two-time Academic All-American. He also won the 2009 Western Amateur.

Professional career
Hahn qualified for the 2013 U.S. Open, in which he missed the cut.

Hahn earned his 2014 European Tour via qualifying school. After finishing 120th in the Race to Dubai, he had to re-qualify again in 2014. In the fourth round of a six-round qualifying school tournament, Hahn became one of four golfers in history to shoot a round of 58 in a professional tournament. Hahn's 58 came on the Tour Course at the PGA Catalunya Resort. The following day, Hahn shot a 78 at the nearby Stadium Course, taking him out of contention for the tournament. He finished the tournament in 50th place at 2-under-par. His best professional finish is third, which he achieved at the 2014 Africa Open.

Amateur wins
2009 Towson University Invitational, Mid-American Conference Championship, Western Amateur
2010 Mid-American Conference Championship (tie), The Gopher Invitational
2011 Annual Louisiana Classics, Fireline Towson Invitational, Robert Kepler Intercollegiate (tie)

Source:

Results in major championships

CUT = missed the half-way cut

See also
2013 European Tour Qualifying School graduates

References

External links

American male golfers
Kent State Golden Flashes men's golfers
European Tour golfers
Golfers from Columbus, Ohio
1989 births
Living people